Stella Ambler (born September 29, 1966) is a Canadian politician who served as the Member of Parliament for the federal electoral district of Mississauga South from 2011 to 2015. She is a member of the Conservative Party.

Background
Ambler's parents are Italian immigrants who met and married in Canada, settling in Etobicoke then moving to Brampton. She obtained a degree in psychology from the University of Toronto. Ambler married her husband, Richard Ambler, in 1992. She worked as a political advisor to the Ontario government but left this position to stay at home and raise her children for nine years.  They lived in Brampton together before moving to Mississauga's Lorne Park neighbourhood.

Politics

Ambler was the Director of Regional Affairs (Greater Toronto Area) to the Minister responsible for Ontario, the former Finance Minister Jim Flaherty. She ran in the 2008 federal election in the riding of Bramalea—Gore—Malton, but was defeated by Liberal Gurbax Singh Malhi. In the 2011 election she defeated Liberal MP Paul Szabo in the riding of Mississauga South. Both Szabo and Ambler are strong supporters of the movement to criminalize abortion services. Ambler was a backbench MP in the Stephen Harper government.

In 2013, Ambler was appointed Chair of the Special Committee on Violence Against Indigenous Women.  A year later, the Committee released a report on the issue of missing and murdered aboriginal women that called for more action on the issue. Critics of the report complained that the report failed to recommend the establishment of a national inquiry into the issue. The Liberals campaigned on establishing such an inquiry. The Trudeau government established the Inquiry immediately after defeating the Harper Conservatives.

Ambler is a supporter of the anti-abortion movement. In 2012, she voted in favour of a private member's bill sponsored by Stephen Woodworth that sought to review the definition of conception under the criminal code. In 2013, she voted in favour of another private member's bill that sought to ban sex-selective abortions. In May 2015, she participated in a rally that urged demonstrators to vote for anti-abortion candidates in the upcoming election.

Ambler was the Conservative candidate in the 2015 election for the new riding of Mississauga—Lakeshore. On August 4, 2015, she was defeated by Sven Spengemann in the 42nd general election.

In 2020, Stella moved to the town of Wasaga Beach, Ontario. On November 27, 2020, it was reported that she launched her campaign to become the next candidate for the Progressive Conservative Party of Ontario to represent the riding of Simcoe—Grey.

Electoral record

References

External links

1966 births
Canadian politicians of Italian descent
Women members of the House of Commons of Canada
Conservative Party of Canada MPs
Members of the House of Commons of Canada from Ontario
Living people
People from Etobicoke
Politicians from Mississauga
Politicians from Toronto
Women in Ontario politics
21st-century Canadian politicians
21st-century Canadian women politicians